Janine di Giovanni is an author, journalist, and war correspondent currently serving as the Executive Director of The Reckoning Project. She is a senior fellow at Yale University's Jackson Institute for Global Affairs, a non-resident Fellow at The New America Foundation and the Geneva Center for Security Policy in International Security and a life member of the Council on Foreign Relations. She was named a 2019 Guggenheim Fellow, and in 2020, the American Academy of Arts and Letters awarded her the Blake-Dodd nonfiction prize for her lifetime body of work. She has contributed to The Times, Vanity Fair, Granta, The New York Times, and The Guardian.

Early life
Di Giovanni is the seventh child of an Italian-born father and a mother from an Italian-American family. She was raised in New Jersey. Originally she wanted to become a humanitarian doctor in Africa, but initially embarked on an academic career. Di Giovanni attended the University of Maine, where she majored in English.

Career 

Di Giovanni began reporting by covering the First Palestinian Intifada and Nicaragua in 1987 for the London Times and The Spectator and has reported on other conflicts since then.  Di Giovanni has described herself as a "human rights reporter" with a focus on war crimes and crimes against humanity.

She has reported on the genocides in Bosnia, Rwanda and currently Syria. She continued to write about Bosnia, and in 2000 she was one of the few foreign reporters to witness the fall of Grozny, Chechnya. She received awards for her depictions of the terror after the fall of the city, including the Amnesty International Prize and Britain's Foreign Correspondent of the Year.

During the war in Kosovo, di Giovanni traveled with the Kosovo Liberation Army into occupied Kosovo and sustained a bombing raid on her unit which left many soldiers dead. Her article on that incident, and many of her other experiences during the Balkan Wars, "Madness Visible" for Vanity Fair (2000), won the National Magazine Award for reporting. She later expanded her article into a book for Knopf/Bloomsbury.

In 1999, she became a contributing editor to Vanity Fair and continued to report for both The Times and Vanity Fair in Afghanistan and Iraq as well as Africa. Later, she reported on the Arab Spring. Many of her early essays were compiled in a book published by Bloomsbury, The Place at the End of the World.

In 2010, di Giovanni was the president of the Jury of the Bayeux-Calvados Awards for war correspondents.

In 2013, di Giovanni joined Newsweek as Middle East Editor and began working primarily in the Syria, Egypt, Kurdistan, Lebanon and Iraq regions. She also continued to work in North Africa and in South Sudan. That year, di Giovanni was named one of the 100 most influential people in the world of armed violence by the organization Action on Armed Violence.

In 2014, she was a consultant on Syria for the United Nations High Commissioner for Refugees (UNHCR) and a Senior Policy Manager/Advisor at the Centre for Conflict, Resolution and Recovery for the School of Public Policy at Central European University. She has worked with researchers from Amnesty International and Human Rights Watch.

In a Newsweek article titled "The Fall of France" in 2014, di Giovanni extensively criticised the French social and taxation systems. Following publication, a number of points she cited to support her argument were deemed inaccurate. "Les décodeurs", the fact-checking blog of the French newspaper Le Monde, reported nine mistakes. These mistakes included "The top tax rate is 75 percent, and a great many pay in excess of 70 percent" when in actuality it is "companies not individuals who must pay this tax, which only applies to salaries over a million euros". Additionally her claim of milk costing €3 a half liter in Paris and nappies being free to new mothers were inaccurate as, "the price of milk, which they pointed out, costs around €1.30 a litre, while neither creches nor nappies are free". The article was also severely criticised by Pierre Moscovici, the French Minister of Economy.

In 2016, di Giovanni was awarded the Courage in Journalism prize from the IWMF. She also won the Hay Medal for Prose from the Hay 

She has made two long format documentaries for the BBC. In 2000, she returned to Bosnia to make Lessons from History, a report on five years of peace after the Dayton Accords. The following year she visited Jamaica to report on police assassinations of civilians, Dead Men Tell No Tales.

Di Giovanni was the subject of a documentary about women war reporters, No Man's Land (1993) which followed her working in Sarajevo. She is one of the journalists featured in a documentary about women war reporters, Bearing Witness (2005), by Barbara Kopple and is also a subject in the documentary film 7 Days in Syria (2015), directed by Robert Rippberger and produced by Scott Rosenfelt. The film had a screening at the House of Lords.

In 2018, di Giovanni was appointed as the Edward R. Murrow Press Fellow at the Council on Foreign Relations and was also serving as adjunct professor of international and public affairs at the School of International and Public Affairs at Columbia University.

In 2019, di Giovanni was named a Guggenheim Fellow. Di Giovanni is also a senior fellow at Yale University Jackson Institute for Global Affairs.

In 2022, di Giovanni founded The Reckoning Project: Ukraine Testifies, a non-government organization that trains conflict journalists and researchers to gather legally admissible testimonies documenting war crimes and crimes against humanity committed during the 2022 Russian Invasion of Ukraine.

Personal life 
Di Giovanni has been married twice. Her first husband was photographer Marc Schlossman. The couple married in a New Jersey Roman Catholic church in 1986; they divorced in 1995. While based in Sarajevo, di Giovanni met the French journalist, Bruno Girodon; the couple married in August 2003 in St.-Guillaume, France in a civil ceremony, but separated in 2008.

Awards
 National Magazine Award (2000), for "Madness Visible"
 Amnesty International Award (2000, 2001), for reporting on Bosnia and Sierra Leone, two-time recipient
  What the Papers Say Foreign Correspondent of the Year Granada Television (UK), for reporting on Chechnya
 Courage in Journalism Award (2016)
 Hay Medal for Prose (2016), for The Morning They Came For Us: Dispatches From Syria and Madness Visible: A Memoir of War

Publications
 Against the Stranger. Viking, 1993. .
 The Quick and the Dead: Under Siege in Sarajevo. Phoenix, 1995. .
 Madness Visible: A Memoir of War. Bloomsbury and Knopf, 2004. .
 The Place at the End of the World. London: Bloomsbury, 2006. .
 Ghosts by Daylight. Bloomsbury and Knopf, 2011. .
 Eve Arnold: Magnum Legacy. Prestel, 2015. .
 The Morning They Came for Us: Dispatches from Syria. Liveright, 2016. .

The New York Times reviewer Michiko Kakutani said of her latest book, "Like the work of the Belarussian Nobel laureate Svetlana Alexievich, Ms. di Giovanni's book gives voice to ordinary people living through a dark time in history; ...it chronicles the intimate fallout that war has on women, children and families." Kirkus Reviews described her, and her book; "[Di Giovanni] is a master of war reporting, especially its civilian side. Thanks to her bitter sacrifice, Western readers may begin to appreciate the chaos that Syrian refugees continue to flee. This brilliant, necessary book will hopefully do for Syria what Herr's Dispatches (1977) did for Vietnam."

Di Giovanni's book about Christians in the Middle East, The Vanishing, is scheduled to be published by Public Affairs in 2021.

Filmography

Documentaries made by Di Giovanni
Lessons from History (2000, BBC)
Dead Men Tell No Tales (2001, BBC)

Documentary films featuring Di Giovanni
No Man's Land (1993)
Bearing Witness (2005) – a television film by Barbara Kopple and Marijana Wotton.
7 Days in Syria (2015) – documentary film directed/produced by Robert Rippberger, co-produced by and co-starring Di Giovanni.

Fellowships
 Non-resident Fellow in International Security at New America in Washington, D.C.
 Associate Fellow at the Geneva Centre for Security Policy in Switzerland
 Guggenheim Fellow (2019)

References

External links 
 
 

Year of birth missing (living people)
Living people
American expatriates in France
American expatriates in the United Kingdom
American non-fiction writers
American women war correspondents
American women writers
People from Caldwell, New Jersey
American women journalists
21st-century American women